The Annual Review of Marine Science is an annual peer-reviewed scientific review journal published by Annual Reviews. It was established in 2009. It covers all aspects of marine science. The co-editors are Craig A. Carlson and Stephen J. Giovannoni. As of 2022, Journal Citation Reports gives the journal a 2020 impact factor of 16.561, ranking it first out of   113 in the category "Marine & Freshwater Biology", first out of 66 in the category "Oceanography", and second out of 87 journals in the category "Geochemistry & Geophysics".

History
The Annual Review of Marine Science was first published in 2009 by nonprofit publisher Annual Reviews. Its founding editors were Craig A. Carlson and Stephen J. Giovannoni. While it was initially published with a print edition, it is now only published online.

Scope and indexing
The Annual Review of Marine Science defines its scope as covering significant developments in marine science. Included subfields are chemical, biological, geological, and physical processes that occur in the coastal and oceanic zones. It also covers marine conservation, marine biology, and technologies used in the study of oceanography. As of 2022, Journal Citation Reports gives the journal a 2021 impact factor of 16.561, ranking it first out of   111 in the category "Marine & Freshwater Biology", first out of 66 in the category "Oceanography", and second out of 87 journals in the category "Geochemistry & Geophysics".  It is abstracted and indexed in Scopus, Science Citation Index Expanded, EMBASE, INSPEC, CAB Abstracts, MEDLINE, and GEOBASE, among others.

Editorial processes
The Annual Review of Marine Science is helmed by the editor or the co-editors. The editor is assisted by the editorial committee, which includes associate editors, regular members, and occasionally guest editors. Guest members participate at the invitation of the editor, and serve terms of one year. All other members of the editorial committee are appointed by the Annual Reviews board of directors and serve five-year terms. The editorial committee determines which topics should be included in each volume and solicits reviews from qualified authors. Unsolicited manuscripts are not accepted. Peer review of accepted manuscripts is undertaken by the editorial committee.

Current editorial board
As of 2022, the editorial committee consists of the two co-editors and the following members:

 Lihini Aluwihare
 Ken Buesseler
 Curtis Deutsch
 Stéphan J. Jorry
 Kristy J. Kroeker
 Uta Passow
 Raquel S. Peixoto 
 Andrew F. Thompson
 Patricia L. Wiberg

References 

 

Marine Science
Annual journals
Oceanography journals
Publications established in 2009
English-language journals